The cervical fascia is fascia found in the region of the neck.

It usually refers to the deep cervical fascia. However, there is also a superficial cervical fascia.

Fascia